Martin Dülfer (1 January 1859, Breslau – 21 December 1942, Dresden) was a German architect and professor; best known for designing theatres in the Historical and Art-Nouveau styles.

Life and work 
His father, Carl Dülfer, was a publisher and book dealer. After completing his secondary education, he attended a trade school in Schweidnitz. Then, from 1877 to 1879, he studied at the Polytechnic School in Hannover, with Conrad Wilhelm Hase and, from 1879 to 1880, at the Technischen Hochschule in Stuttgart with Christian Friedrich von Leins. He completed his studies from 1885 to 1886, at the Technical University of Munich, with Friedrich von Thiersch.

His own independent career began in 1887; creating designs in the prevailing Neo-Baroque style. Around 1900, he turned to Art-Nouveau; designing mostly apartments and commercial buildings. During this period, he built his first theatre, in Meran, soon followed by four more. Several other designs were created for project competitions, some of which received first place, but they were never implemented due to financial or political issues.

He married Käte Weigand in 1893. The marriage remained childless, but they adopted a nine-year-old boy in 1915. He also admitted to fathering an illegitimate daughter in 1905, during a visit to the United States. 

In 1902, he was awarded the honorary title of "Royal Bavarian Professor". Four years later, he was appointed to succeed Karl Weißbach as professor of building design at the Technical University of Dresden. He was also a member of several professional associations, serving as chairman of the Association of German Architects.

He was a recipient of the Order of the Crown, third-class, in 1911. The Technical University presented him with an honorary doctorate in 1913, and the Technical University of Berlin followed suit in 1928. He became a professor emeritus in 1929 and disappeared from public notice until 1939, when he was given the Goethe-Medaille für Kunst und Wissenschaft, despite the fact that he was a Freemason and therefore considered to be an "unreliable" person under Nazi cultural policy.

Three years later, he died.

Selected buildings

Sources 
 Dieter Klein: Martin Dülfer. Wegbereiter der deutschen Jugendstilarchitektur. (Arbeitshefte des Bayerischen Landesamtes für Denkmalpflege, Vol.8.), 2nd edition, Verlag Lipp, Munich 1993,

External links 

 
 
 Martin Dülfer website

19th-century German architects
History of Munich
1859 births
1942 deaths
20th-century German architects